A Man Called Tiger (Hong Kong title Leng mian hu) is a 1973 Hong Kong martial arts action thriller starring Jimmy Wang and Maria Yi and directed by Lo Wei.

Plot
Chin Fu (Jimmy Wang Yu)'s father was a kung-fu master who was murdered. Chin Fu shows up at a nightclub to revenge for his father's murder. Chin teams up with a sexy lounge singer Keiko (Maria Yi) and heads out to infiltrate the Japanese mafia.

Cast 
 Jimmy Wang Yu - Chin Fu
 Kawai Okada - Yoshida Ayako
 Kuro Mitsuo - Boss Shimizu Shobon
 Tien Feng - Boss Yamamoto
 James Tin Chuen - Liu Han-Ming
 Nakako Daisuke - Killer Yoshida Ryohei
 Kasahara Reiko - Shimizu' s secretary
 Han Ying-Chieh - Lin Mu-Lang
 Minakaze Yuko - Chang Li-Hua
 Maria Yi - Keiko, a lounge singer
 Lee Kwan - Siu Lee
 Lo Wei - Miyamoto
 Hsiao Yin-Fang - Kushi Ichiro / Nagatani Shoki
 Kam Shan - Yamamoto's thug Sonataro
 Chin Yuet-Sang - Shimizu's thug
 Lam Ching-Ying - Shimizu's thug
 Lee Tin-Ying - Shimizu's thug

Review 
Quentin Tarantino wrote "For most of the movie it looks like a Japanese Yakuza film, plays like an Italian gangster film, and has the fight every ten minutes pace of a Hong Kong chop socky pic, until suddenly, without any proper set up, we find ourselves into the beginning of the film’s extended climax."

References

External links

1973 films
Hong Kong action thriller films
1970s martial arts films
Kung fu films
Hong Kong martial arts films
1970s action thriller films
1970s Hong Kong films